is a city located in Iwate Prefecture, Japan. , the city had an estimated population of 35,452, and a population density of 110 persons per km2 in 14,895 households.

Geography
Ōfunato is located in southeastern Iwate Prefecture, with the Pacific Ocean to the east. Outside its bay, the warm and cold ocean currents meet, which allow a commercial fishing industry to flourish. The city has been attempting to establish itself as a major shipping port. Kaminari-iwa on the city's Goishi coastline has been designated one of the 100 Soundscapes of Japan by the Ministry of the Environment. Much of the city is within the borders of the Sanriku Fukkō National Park.

Neighbouring municipalities 
Iwate Prefecture
Kamaishi
Rikuzentakata
Sumita

Climate
Ōfunato has a humid subtropical climate (Köppen climate classification Cfa) bordering on a humid continental climate (Köppen climate classification Dfa) with warm summers and cold winters. The average annual temperature in Ōfunato is 8.4 °C. The average annual rainfall is 1472 mm with September as the wettest month and January as the driest month. The temperatures are highest on average in August, at around 21.0 °C, and lowest in January, at around -2.9 °C.

Demographics
Per Japanese census data, the population of Ōfunato peaked around the year 1980, and has declined over the past 40 years.

History
The area of present-day Ōfunato was part of ancient Mutsu Province, and has been settled since at least the Jōmon period, and numerous shell middens around Ōfunato Bay have been excavated by archaeologists. During the Sengoku period, the area was dominated by various samurai clans before coming under the control of the Date clan during the Edo period, who ruled Sendai Domain under the Tokugawa shogunate.

The village of Ōfunato was created within Kessen District, Iwate on 1 April 1889 with the establishment of the modern municipalities system. The 1896 Sanriku earthquake caused a 25-meter tsunami which killed 27,000 people in the area. Ōfunato was elevated to town status on 1 April 1932. The 1933 Sanriku earthquake had a magnitude of 8.4 and caused a 28-meter tsunami which killed 1522 people.

The neighboring town of Sakari and the villages of Akasaki, Takkon, Massaki, Ikawa and Hikoroichi merged with Ōfunato on 1 April 1952, forming the city of Ōfunato. The city became internationally famous when it was hit by a tsunami caused by the Valdivia earthquake in Chile 22 May 1960. On 15 November 2001, the town of Sanriku (from Kesen District) was merged into Ōfunato.

2011 Tōhoku earthquake and tsunami 

Ōfunato hit the headlines again when it was heavily damaged in the 2011 Tōhoku earthquake and tsunami. The wave was estimated to have reached 23.6 meters in height. Funneled in by the narrow bay, the tsunami continued inland for 3 kilometres. The town's theatre was one of very few buildings left standing (and remarkably, was undamaged) and gave shelter to about 250 survivors. Provisional counts listed 3,498 houses out of 15,138 houses in the town destroyed by the tsunami and 305 lives were confirmed lost.  At least six of the town's 58 designated evacuation sites were inundated by the tsunami. Ofunato was featured in the British documentary "Japan's Tsunami Caught on Camera" which was broadcast on Channel 4 in the United Kingdom.

Government
Ōfunato has a mayor-council form of government with a directly elected mayor and a unicameral city legislature of 25 members. Ōfunato contributes one seat to the Iwate Prefectural legislature. In terms of national politics, the city is part of Iwate 2nd district of the lower house of the Diet of Japan.

Economy
The local economy is largely based on commercial fishing, with cement production and wood processing as secondary industries.

Education
Kitasato University – Sanriku campus
 Ōfunato has 11 public elementary schools and five public middle schools operated by the city government, and two public high schools operated by the Iwate Prefectural Board of Education. The city also has one private high school.

Transportation

Railway
Sanriku Railway Company – Sanriku Railway Rias Line
 ––––––
 East Japan Railway Company (JR East) – Ōfunato Line (services suspended indefinitely and replaced by a BRT)
 –––

Highway

Port
Port of Ōfunato

Local attractions
 Goishi Coast, National Place of Scenic Beauty and Natural Monument
Shimofunato Shell Mound, Ōhora Shell Mound, Takonoura Shell Mound, National Historic Sites
Sangojima, National Place of Scenic Beauty

International relations
  – Palos de la Frontera, Huelva, Spain – sister city since 12 August 1992

Noted people from Ōfunato 
Yoshinobu Fujiwara, politician
Nanae Sasaki, marathon runner
Tochinohana Hitoshi, sumo wrestler

References

External links

Official Website 
Video footage of the 2011 Tōhoku earthquake and tsunami as experienced in Ōfunato

Cities in Iwate Prefecture
Port settlements in Japan
Populated coastal places in Japan
Ōfunato, Iwate